Dwayne Haskins Jr. (May 3, 1997 – April 9, 2022) was an American football quarterback who played in the National Football League (NFL) for three seasons. He played college football at Ohio State, where he set the Big Ten Conference records for single-season passing yards and passing touchdowns as a sophomore. His success earned him the Sammy Baugh Trophy and Kellen Moore Award, along with several conference honors.

Haskins was selected by the Washington Redskins in the first round of the 2019 NFL Draft, but was released after less than two seasons due to inconsistent play and questions over his work ethic. He signed with the Pittsburgh Steelers in 2021 and served as a backup until his death the following off-season when he was fatally struck by a vehicle.

Early life
Born in Highland Park, New Jersey, Haskins and his family moved to Potomac, Maryland, when he was in the ninth grade. There, he attended and played football at Bullis School from 2013 to 2016, where he passed for 5,308 yards and 54 touchdowns. He originally committed to the University of Maryland over Rutgers University to play college football, but later decided to attend Ohio State University after Maryland football coach Randy Edsall was fired mid-season.

College career

Haskins redshirted his first year with the Buckeyes in 2016. The following year, he was the backup to J. T. Barrett. He finished the season completing 40 of 57 passes for 565 yards and four touchdowns. Haskins then went on to have a record-setting campaign in his sophomore season in 2018, which was his lone starting season at the school. He claimed the single-season passing and touchdown records for Ohio State and the Big Ten by eclipsing the 4,000-passing yards mark and throwing 50 touchdowns, making him just one of eight NCAA quarterbacks to ever achieve the latter in a single season.

Additionally, he claimed school records in total offense in a season (4,900+ yards), total offensive yards in a game (477) and total passing yards in a game (470). In all 12 of his starts, he threw for more than 225 passing yards, including eight games of more than 300 yards, and four games of more than 400. He threw for 499 yards and five touchdowns in the 2018 Big Ten Football Championship Game, while throwing three touchdowns in the 2019 Rose Bowl, winning the MVP award in both games for his performance.

His performance also earned him first-team All–Big Ten honors, as well as six Big Ten Offensive Player of the Week awards, the Graham–George Offensive Player of the Year, the Griese–Brees Quarterback of the Year, the Chicago Tribune Silver Football, and the Male Ohio State Athlete of the Year awards. He was also named as a semifinalist for the Maxwell Award, and finished third in the Heisman Trophy voting. In January 2019, Haskins announced that he would forgo his remaining two years of college football and enter the 2019 NFL Draft. As a student, he majored in journalism.

Professional career

Washington Redskins / Football Team
Haskins was drafted by the Washington Redskins in the first round of the 2019 NFL Draft, 15th overall. Despite his high school and college jersey number of 7 being unofficially retired by the Redskins in honor of quarterback Joe Theismann, whose career ended with a leg injury in 1985, Haskins requested and was granted permission from him to wear it. Haskins signed his four-year rookie contract on May 9, 2019, worth $14.37 million, including an $8.47 million signing bonus.

2019 season

Haskins saw his first action with the team in a Week 4 game against the New York Giants in relief of Case Keenum, who was benched for poor performance. In the game, Haskins also struggled, throwing for 107 yards and three interceptions, including a pick-six, as the Redskins lost 24–3. During a Week 8 game against the Minnesota Vikings, Haskins again replaced Keenum, who left the game due to a concussion. He finished the game with 33 passing yards and an interception as the Redskins lost 19–9. The following week Haskins made his first career start against the Buffalo Bills, finishing with 144 passing yards as the team lost 24–9.

Haskins' first win as a starter came during Week 12 against the Detroit Lions, where he finished with 156 passing yards, 28 rushing yards, and an interception in the 19–16 victory. For his efforts, he was named the Pepsi NFL Rookie of the Week. In Week 16 against the Giants, Haskins threw for 133 yards and two touchdowns before being carted off the field due to an ankle injury suffered on the first play of the third quarter, which also made him miss the following week's game.

2020 season

Prior to the 2020 season, Haskins lost around seven-percent in total body fat and was named the starter and one of the team captains. In a Week 3 loss against the Cleveland Browns, Haskins threw three interceptions and lost a fumble. The following week against the Baltimore Ravens, he threw for a career-high 314 yards in another loss. Haskins was benched in favor of Kyle Allen prior to the Week 5 game against the Los Angeles Rams due to coaches being unimpressed with his work ethic and performance. In October 2020, he was fined 4,833 for breaking league COVID-19 protocols after making a reservation for a family friend at the team hotel in New York prior to a game against the Giants.

Haskins remained as the team's backup until the Week 14 game against the San Francisco 49ers, where he played in the second half after Alex Smith left the game due to a calf strain. He then started the following week's game against the Seattle Seahawks as Smith had yet to recover from injury. In the game, Haskins threw for 295 yards and one touchdown with two interceptions during a 20–15 loss. Following the game, Haskins was photographed attending his girlfriend's birthday party without wearing a face mask. Due to breaking COVID-19 protocols again, he was fined $40,000 by the team and lost his status as a captain. Despite that, he started the Week 16 game against the Carolina Panthers but was benched for Taylor Heinicke in the fourth quarter after throwing 14 of 28 for 154 yards and two interceptions, finishing with a passer rating of 36.9 in a 20–13 loss. Haskins was released by the team the day after, with head coach Ron Rivera saying he believed that it benefited both parties if they went their separate ways.

Pittsburgh Steelers
Haskins signed with the Pittsburgh Steelers on January 21, 2021. He was named the third-string quarterback behind Ben Roethlisberger and Mason Rudolph and was inactive for all but one game that season. Haskins signed a one-year, restricted free agent tender by the team on March 16, 2022.

NFL career statistics

Personal life
Haskins was a Christian and was married. His mentor during high school and college was NFL wide receiver Mohamed Sanu, whom he met through Mohamed Jabbie, one of his best friends and Sanu's nephew. A New Jersey native, Haskins grew up a New York Giants fan.

Haskins went by the nickname Simba, taken from the protagonist of the 1994 film The Lion King. He adopted it as a child due to him having an afro at the time that reminded his mother of a lion's mane. He used the nickname and the film's coming-of-age story as motivation and incorporated it into his personal clothing brand, Kingdom of Pride.

Death
Haskins died as a direct result from injuries he sustained around 7a.m. EDT on April 9, 2022, after he was struck by a dump truck while attempting to cross Interstate 595 near Fort Lauderdale, Florida, on foot. He was in Florida to train with several of his Steelers teammates. His wife, who was not traveling with him, received a call from Haskins after he had run out of gasoline for his rented vehicle letting her know of his attempt to get more at a gas station prior to being struck. Haskins was knocked back several feet by a dump truck and either run over or struck a second time by an SUV that swerved in an attempt to avoid him. A toxicology report revealed he had a blood alcohol level of .24 and had also tested positive for ketamine and norketamine. His death was ruled an accident.

References

External links

 Ohio State Buckeyes bio

1997 births
2022 deaths
21st-century African-American sportspeople
African-American Christians
African-American players of American football
American football quarterbacks
Ohio State Buckeyes football players
Pedestrian road incident deaths
People from Highland Park, New Jersey
People from Potomac, Maryland
Pittsburgh Steelers players
Players of American football from Maryland
Players of American football from New Jersey
Road incident deaths in Florida
Sportspeople from Middlesex County, New Jersey
Sportspeople from Montgomery County, Maryland
Washington Football Team players
Washington Redskins players